Usha (Sanskrit: उषा, IAST: Uṣā) is a character in Hindu mythology. She is the daughter of the asura king Banasura and the wife of Aniruddha, the grandson of Krishna. Her story of falling in love with Aniruddha and wedding him is described in the Bhagavata Purana.

Legend 
One day, Usha saw a young man in her dream, made love to him, and fell in love with him.  Chitralekha, a friend of Usha a talented artist, helped Usha to identify the young man seen in her dream by sketching various portraits of the Vrishnis. Usha realised that she had dreamt of Aniruddha, the grandson of Krishna. Chitralekha, through her yogic powers, shrunk Aniruddha to the size of a doll, abducted him from the palace of Krishna and brought him to Shonitapura.

Usha worshipped her lover and furnished him with priceless garments, garlands, fragrances, lamps, and with beverages, dishes, and words. Breaking her vow of chastity with him, she kept him hidden in her maiden quarters, and the lovers lost track of the days. Catching wind of his daughter's activities, Banasura rushed to her chambers to find her playing dice with doll sized Aniruddha. Even as the prince fended off the guards, Banasura subdued him with the mystical ropes of Varuna due to Aniruddha's shrunken state. Usha was overwhelmed with sorrow due to this incident. Aniruddha was held captive by Banasura for a month, until Narada informed the Yadus in Dvaraka, who were searching for Aniruddha.

The Yadus' army attacked Banasura in a great battle. When the Yadu princes and their army besieged his kingdom with 12 akshauhinis, surrounding it completely. Banasura staged a fierce counterattack. During the war, Shiva appeared on the battlefield, riding on Nandi, to protect his devotee, Banasura. Balarama fought against Banasura's commander, while Samba fought against Banasura's son. To bear witness, the leaders of the godly souls headed by Brahma came in their celestial vehicles, as also the sages, the perfected souls, and the venerable personalities, the singers and apsaras of heaven, and the yakshinis. Krishna and Shiva faced each other. Krishna used a brahmastra against Shiva's brahmastra, a mountain weapon against a wind weapon, a rain weapon against a fire weapon, and his narayanastra against Shiva's pasupatiastra. Kartikeya, assaulted by Pradyumna's arrows, fled the battlefield on his peacock. After duelling with Satyaki, Bana took up arms against Krishna. However, Krishna blew his conch and instantly, Banasura's charioteer was killed and his chariot broken and shattered.

In a desperate attempt to save Banasura, Kothara, his mother, stood naked before Krishna with her hair dishevelled. When the deity looked away, the asura fled to the city. When Shiva's forces had been defeated, Jvara, the embodiment of Shiva's fever, bearing three heads and three feet, attacked Krishna with scorching heat. Krishna produced his own Jvara of frigid coldness, and the two fought each other. Overwhelmed by Vishnu's fever, Shiva's Jvara offered its surrender and obeisance to Krishna and departed.

Meanwhile, Balarama defeated Banasura's commander. Bana rode forth upon his chariot to fight with Krishna, and the latter fought back with his Sudarshana Chakra. When Krishna started chopping Banasura's arms, Shiva returned to his senses and extolled the glories of Krishna, not to kill Banasura, whom he had bestowed with fearlessness. Obliging, Krishna replied that he had never intended to kill Banasura, since he was the son of Bali and the grandson of the devout Prahlada. Vishnu had promised Bali not to kill any member of his family, and therefore would not slay him. However, Krishna severed Banasura's extra arms to destroy the latter's pride, leaving Banasura with only four arms.

Banasura realised his mistake and bowed his head before Krishna, arranging for a chariot to seat Aniruddha and Usha for their wedding in Dvaraka.

Rebirth 

According to the Shiva Purana, Usha and Aniruddha were reborn as Behula and Lakshindar in the next life and married each other again.

In popular culture 

A 1901 Telugu language play titled Usha Parinayam written by Vedam Venkataraya Sastry was based on story of Usha. The play was also taken as a Telugu film in 1961 by Kadaru Nagabhushanam under Rajarajeswari films.

Usha Kalyanam is a 1936 Tamil-language film directed by K. Subramaniam.

References 

People related to Krishna 
Mythological princesses
Characters in the Mahabharata
Characters in the Bhagavata Purana